Michael Kay is an English singer, songwriter, and record producer who scored a solo UK hit record with his song "Missing You", released by Sony Music Entertainment. He is known also for his songwriting and development work with the American singer Pink, and his writing for many other artists including Javine Hylton, Célena Cherry of the Honeyz and Hollywood actress Karen David.

Kay wrote and produced the song "Together as One" performed by Preeya Kalidas for the movie Bollywood Queen, starring Preeya Kalidas and James McAvoy.

References

External links
Michael Kay – Missing You on Discogs 
"Bollywood Queen" review 
K2 Music Group

Year of birth missing (living people)
Living people
English male singer-songwriters